Newman S. Clarke was a career military officer in the United States army who served with distinction during the Mexican–American War.

Clarke was born in Connecticut and served in the United States Army during the War of 1812. At the outbreak of the Mexican–American War in 1846, he was appointed colonel in the regular army. He commanded a brigade of regulars in General William J. Worth's division during the siege of Veracruz, being one of the first brigades to wade ashore. For his services at Veracruz, he was awarded with a brevet promotion to brigadier general of regulars. He continued leading his brigade at the battles of Cerro Gordo and Churubusco, where he was wounded. He took a brief leave and command of the brigade went to his next in command, Lt. Col. James S. McIntosh. He was therefore not present at the bloody battle of Molino del Rey in which McIntosh was killed at the head of the brigade. The next officer to assume command of the brigade was also killed and the third commander of the brigade during the battle was severely wounded. Clarke returned to command in time for the assaults on Chapultepec and Mexico City.

Clarke replaced John E. Wool in command of the Department of the Pacific in 1857. Clarke inherited the task of dealing with the ongoing Yakima War, which had begun in 1855.  Responding to recent Indian attacks in southern Washington Territory, Clarke sent out a force of 600 troops under the command of George Wright, who had served with Clarke in Mexico. He also closed the territory to settlement. Wright defeated the Indians at the Battle of Four Lakes, but Clarke continued to keep settlers out. On September 13, 1858, Clarke took command of the Department of California, one of the two Army Departments created to replace the Department of the Pacific, while command of the Department of Oregon was turned over to General William S. Harney.

Clarke died a year later on October 17, 1860, while living in San Francisco, California.

References
 The Coeur d'Alene War

American military personnel of the Mexican–American War
United States Army officers
1860 deaths
Year of birth unknown